John F. Melia (June 5, 1915 – June 24, 1994) was an American politician who was a member of the Massachusetts House of Representatives from 1965 to 1981.

Melia was born on June 5, 1915, in Boston. He attended Brighton High School and Boston Commerce Graduate School. Prior to entering politics, Melia worked as a caterer and food consultant. From 1965 to 1981, Melia represented Brighton in the Massachusetts House of Representatives. He was defeated in the 1980 Democratic primary in Thomas M. Gallagher. Melia died on June 24, 1994, at Pilgrim Manor Nursing Home in Plymouth, Massachusetts after a long illness.

References

1915 births
1994 deaths
Democratic Party members of the Massachusetts House of Representatives
Politicians from Boston
Brighton High School (Brighton, Massachusetts) alumni